The European Convention on Extradition is a multilateral treaty on extradition drawn in 1957 up by the member states of the Council of Europe and in force between all of them. The Convention is also available for signature by non-members which as of January 2012 are Israel, South Africa and South Korea. Prior to the introduction of the European Arrest Warrant, the Convention governed extradition between member states of the European Union.

There are 4 additional protocols to the convention that vary the conditions signed up to by individual states.

See also
List of Council of Europe treaties

References

External links
 Text of the Convention from the Council of Europe Treaty Office.

Extradition treaties
Council of Europe treaties
Treaties concluded in 1957
Treaties entered into force in 1960
Treaties of Albania
Treaties of Andorra
Treaties of Armenia
Treaties of Austria
Treaties of Azerbaijan
Treaties of Belgium
Treaties of Bosnia and Herzegovina
Treaties of Bulgaria
Treaties of Croatia
Treaties of Cyprus
Treaties of the Czech Republic
Treaties of Denmark
Treaties of Estonia
Treaties of Finland
Treaties of France
Treaties of Georgia (country)
Treaties of West Germany
Treaties of Greece
Treaties of Hungary
Treaties of Iceland
Treaties of Ireland
Treaties of Italy
Treaties of Latvia
Treaties of Liechtenstein
Treaties of Lithuania
Treaties of Luxembourg
Treaties of Malta
Treaties of Moldova
Treaties of Monaco
Treaties of Montenegro
Treaties of the Netherlands
Treaties of Norway
Treaties of Poland
Treaties of Portugal
Treaties of Romania
Treaties of Russia
Treaties of San Marino
Treaties of Serbia and Montenegro
Treaties of Slovakia
Treaties of Slovenia
Treaties of Spain
Treaties of Sweden
Treaties of Switzerland
Treaties of North Macedonia
Treaties of Turkey
Treaties of Ukraine
Treaties of the United Kingdom
Treaties of Israel
Treaties of South Africa
Treaties of South Korea
Treaties of Czechoslovakia
1957 in France
Treaties extended to Greenland
Treaties extended to the Faroe Islands
Treaties extended to the Netherlands Antilles
Treaties extended to Aruba
Treaties extended to Jersey
Treaties extended to Guernsey
Treaties extended to the Isle of Man
Treaties extended to French Guiana
Treaties extended to French Polynesia
Treaties extended to Guadeloupe
Treaties extended to Martinique
Treaties extended to Mayotte
Treaties extended to New Caledonia
Treaties extended to Réunion
Treaties extended to Saint Pierre and Miquelon
Treaties extended to Wallis and Futuna